Ray Yakavonis (born January 20, 1957) is a former American football defensive tackle. He played for the Minnesota Vikings from 1981 to 1983 and for the Kansas City Chiefs in 1983.

References

1957 births
Living people
American football defensive tackles
East Stroudsburg Warriors football players
Minnesota Vikings players
Kansas City Chiefs players